In Greek mythology, Pireus (Ancient Greek: Πειρέως) or Peireus was the father of Autonoe who became the mother of Palaemon by the hero Heracles.

Note

Reference 

 Apollodorus, The Library with an English Translation by Sir James George Frazer, F.B.A., F.R.S. in 2 Volumes, Cambridge, MA, Harvard University Press; London, William Heinemann Ltd. 1921. ISBN 0-674-99135-4. Online version at the Perseus Digital Library. Greek text available from the same website.

Characters in Greek mythology